Empathy is the debut full-length studio album by British trip hop duo Mandalay. It was first released on March 23, 1998 through V2 Records. The track "Flowers Bloom" was previously released as a single in 1996 through Organic Music, and the tracks "This Life" and "Beautiful" were both released as singles to promote the album. The recording was released with positive critical feedback, one reviewer in particular said that it is "Highly recommended for pop and trip hop fans."

Track listing

Personnel

Mandalay
Saul Freeman - Composition, guitar, bass, synthesizer, piano, sampler 
Nicola Hitchcock - Composition, lyrics, vocals

Additional musicians
Guy Sigsworth - Electric piano, sampler, synthesizer, piano
Jim Carmichael - Drums
Gavin Wright - Strings
Steve Jensen - Drums, piano, percussion
Jon Hassell - Trumpet
Jaak van der Bent - Baritone vocals
David Watters - Tenor vocals
Danny Thompson - Double bass
Warwick Blair - String arrangement on "About You"

Production
Mandalay - Production
Guy Sigsworth - Production
Michael Ade - Tape edits, recording, mixing
Russell Evora - Additional recording
Chris Scard - Additional recording
Ian Rossiter - Additional recording
Paul Stoney - Additional recording
Tom Jenkins - Additional recording
Simon Burwell - Additional recording
Tom Coyne - Mastering
Andy Bradfeild - Mixing on "This Life"
Saul Freeman - Technician

Artwork
Chris Bigg - Art Direction, design
Jim Friedman - Photography
Blinkk - Photography

References

External links

1998 debut albums
Mandalay (band) albums
V2 Records albums
Albums produced by Guy Sigsworth